Leontochroma suppurpuratum is a moth of the family Tortricidae. It is found in Vietnam, China and India.

References

Moths described in 1900
Archipini